Invest Financial Corporation (styled by the company in its own literature as INVEST Financial Corporation) was an American broker/dealer. Invest supervises and supports both financial institutions and independent registered representatives who offer advisory services, investment and insurance products. Invest was formed in 1982 under Dan McConnell and was the first firm to offer securities inside a bank lobby.

Invest had over $24 billion in assets managed by over 1,200 Advisers who are registered with Invest. Invest’s total registered advisers accounted for 1,136 full-time advisers and 274 part-time advisers in approximately 150 Financial Institutions. Invest Corporate Office is located in Tampa, Florida and employed over 165 staff members who support financial advisers.

History 

Formed and solely-owned by Dan McConnell in 1982, Invest Financial was later bought by Brentwood Securities. Brentwood changed its name to Investment Services for America (ISFA) – ISFA Holding Company. Kemper Financial, a major shareholder of ISFA sold Invest to First American National Bank in 1996. First American National Bank was then bought by AmSouth Bank in mid-1999. In 2000, Invest was sold by AmSouth Bank to National Planning Holdings (NPH) and is still a subsidiary of the corporation. Under the NPH umbrella, in 2004, Invest implemented EOE software and E-Sign technology. EOE is a network of online forms, electronic blotters, and basic compliance checks that representatives use when working with clients. E-Sign, a part of EOE, allows representatives to get client signatures for documentation on an electronic pad, eliminating paperwork.

Key dates 

1982 – Founded and solely-owned by Dan McConnell, DBA Evergreen Securities.  Bought by Brentwood Securities.  Changed name to Investment Services for America (ISFA) – ISFA Holding Company.  ISFA Holding bought by Coast Federal S&L and other S&Ls.
1985 – Kemper Financial becomes major shareholder of ISFA.
1992 – Invest exceeds 1000 reps
1996 – Zurich Kemper Investments sells Invest to First American National Bank.  Invest acquires broker dealer ICA.
1999 – First American National Bank bought by AmSouth Bank; Rob Jacobsen is first Invest rep to exceed $1 Million.
2000 – AmSouth Bank sells Invest to National Planning Holdings.
2004 – Electronic Order Entry (EOE) and E-Signature (E-Sign) are introduced.    
2005 – Invest exceeds $100 Million mark in revenues
2007 – Acquired PFIC Contracts
2008 – Paperless mutual fund processing.
2009 – Steve Dowden becomes CEO
2011 – Over 20 Representatives reach $1 Million
2012 – 30 years of business
2018- February 14, 2018, INVEST closes after being sold to LPL Financial.

Affiliations 

Invest Financial Corporation is a subsidiary of National Planning Holdings, Inc. (NPH) a broker-dealer holding company headquartered in Santa Monica, California.  NPH is the holding company for four broker-dealers – Invest, National Planning Corporation, Investment Centers of America, and SII Investments, Inc.  NPH is an affiliate of Jackson National Life Insurance Company (Jackson), headquartered in Lansing, Michigan. It has $165.4 billion in assets (IFRS). The company also offers institutional products.

NPH and Jackson are indirect subsidiaries of Prudential plc, a company incorporated and with its principal place of business in the United Kingdom. It provides insurance and financial services directly and through its subsidiaries and affiliates throughout the world.  It has been in existence for over 160 years and has more than $685 billion in assets under management as of December 31, 2012.  Prudential plc is not affiliated in any manner with Prudential Financial, Inc., a company whose principal place of business is in the United States of America.

Other 

Invest has relationships with two independent clearing firms in the U.S. for brokerage accounts and processing trades - National Financial Services, LLC, a wholly owned subsidiary of Fidelity Investments and Pershing, LLC, a subsidiary of the Bank of New York Company, Inc.

References

External links 
 

American brokers